Sign of the Times is a compilation album by Seattle-based progressive metal band Queensrÿche. It contains a selection of their most notable songs and was released on August 28, 2007. A special collector's edition was also released, including a bonus disc of rarities, live recordings and a previously unreleased song.

Track listing

Personnel
Geoff Tate - vocals
Michael Wilton - lead guitar
Chris DeGarmo - rhythm guitar
Kelly Gray - rhythm guitar
Mike Stone - rhythm guitar
Eddie Jackson - bass
Scott Rockenfield - drums
Pamela Moore - vocals on "All the Promises"
Michael Kamen - orchestral arrangements on "Silent Lucidity" and "Real World"

References

2007 greatest hits albums
Queensrÿche compilation albums
Capitol Records compilation albums